Cleveland Bypass may refer to a number of highways in the United States:

Interstate 271, Ohio
Interstate 480 (Ohio)
APD-40, Tennessee
U.S. Route 11 Bypass (Cleveland, Tennessee)
U.S. Route 129 Bypass (Cleveland, Georgia)/Georgia State Route 11 Bypass (Cleveland) (Appalachian Parkway), a four-lane highway located just west of Cleveland, Georgia

U.S. Route 64
U.S. Route 74
U.S. Route 11
U.S. Route 129